is a town located in Miyagi Prefecture, Japan. , the town had an estimated population of 7,972, and a population density of 97 persons per km² in 2813 households.

Geography
Ōsato is located in central Miyagi Prefecture. The Yoshida River runs east to west through the center of the town, and the fields spread along the river. Hills extend from north to south.

Neighboring municipalities
Miyagi Prefecture
Ōsaki
Taiwa
Ōhira
Matsushima
Rifu

Climate
The town has a climate characterized by cool summers and long cold winters (Köppen climate classification Cfa).  The average annual temperature in Ōsato is 11.9 °C. The average annual rainfall is 1225 mm with September as the wettest month. The temperatures are highest on average in August, at around 24.6 °C, and lowest in January, at around 0.4 °C.

Demographics
Per Japanese census data, the population of Ōsato has declined over the past 30 years.

History
The area of present-day Ōsato was part of ancient Mutsu Province, and has been settled since at least the Jōmon period by the Emishi people and a number of shell middens from that era have been found. A number of kofun burial mounds from the Kofun period also exist in the area. During later portion of the Heian period, the area was ruled by the Northern Fujiwara. During the Sengoku period, the area was contested by various samurai clans before the area came under the control of the Date clan of Sendai Domain during the Edo period, under the Tokugawa shogunate. The area was organized into Ōya, Ōmatsuzawa and Kasukawa villages within Kurokawa District, Miyagi Prefecture with the establishment of the modern municipalities system on April 1, 1884.

Ōsato Village was established on July 1, 1954 with the merger of the three villages. Ōsato was raised to town status on April 1, 1959.

Government
Ōsato has a mayor-council form of government with a directly elected mayor and a unicameral town council of 14 members. Ōsato, together with the rest of Kurokawa District and the city of Tomiya collectively contributes two seats to the Miyagi Prefectural legislature. In terms of national politics, the town is part of Miyagi 5th district of the lower house of the Diet of Japan.

Economy
The economy of Ōsato is largely based on agriculture, primarily the cultivation of rice and jute.

Education
Ōsato has one public elementary school and one public junior high school operated by the town government. The town does not have a high school.

Transportation
Ōsato is not serviced by any passenger rail lines. The nearest train station is Atago Station on the Tōhoku Main Line in the neighboring town of Matsushima. Likewise, Ōsato is not on the national highway network.

Local attractions
Tsunenaga Hasekura memorial park
Site of Okubo Castle
Site of Suwa Castle
Omatsuzawa Shell Mound

Noted people from Ōsato 
Aobayama Hirotoshi – Sumo wrestler

References

External links

Official Website 

 
Towns in Miyagi Prefecture